Clypeola elegans is a species of flowering plant in the family Brassicaceae. It is native to Iran, Transcaucasia and Turkey.

The type specimen is kept at the Royal Botanic Gardens, Kew.

References

External links

Brassicaceae
Plants described in 1856
Flora of Iran
Flora of Turkey
Flora of the Transcaucasus
Taxa named by Pierre Edmond Boissier
Taxa named by Alfred Huet du Pavillon